Ledeberg is a submunicipality of the city of Ghent. It lies south-east of downtown Ghent and has direct access to the E17 road.
Its population is 13,974 inhabitants (2005).

Notable people
 

Jean Fonteyne (1899–1974) lawyer, resistant, politician and filmmaker

References

Sub-municipalities of Ghent
Populated places in East Flanders